Beamer may refer to:   
 Beamer (cricket), an uncommon (illegal) cricket delivery which reaches the batsman at head-height, without bouncing
 Beamer (LaTeX), an extension to the LaTeX typesetting software for creating presentation slides
 Beamer, Indiana, an unincorporated community in Owen County
 Video projector, a pseudo-Anglicism in a number of languages including German, Dutch, Latvian and Swiss French
 Beamer Trail, a hiking trail in Grand Canyon National Park, US
 BMW car (slang)
 Bureau d'Enquêtes sur les Événements de Mer (BEAmer), the French agency that investigates marine accidents
 Beamer (occupation), someone who attended to beams of yarn in the cotton industry
 Beamer (surname)
 Beamer Resolution, a nickname for the US enabling legislation for the Driver License Compact, authored by Rep. John V. Beamer

See also 
 Beemer (disambiguation)
 Bimmer (disambiguation)